Blinken is the surname of the following notable people:
 Alan Blinken (born 1937), American businessman and diplomat
 Antony Blinken (born 1962), American government official and diplomat; U.S. Secretary of State
 Donald M. Blinken (1925–2022), American businessman and diplomat, father of Antony and brother of Alan 
 Meir Blinken (1879–1915), Ukrainian-American writer, grandfather of Alan and Donald